Bahman Maleki (born February 11, 1992) is an Iranian footballer who plays for Giti Pasand in the Azadegan League.

Club career
Maleki played his entire career at Zob Ahan.

Club career statistics

References

External links
Bahman Maleki at PersianLeague.com

1992 births
Living people
Iranian footballers
Zob Ahan Esfahan F.C. players
Giti Pasand players
Iran under-20 international footballers
Association football defenders